The Falémé iron ore deposits are located in south-east Senegal in the Kédougou Region. Several deposits of primary Magnetite and high-grade oxide ores have been explored. The proved, minable reserves amount to 260 million tons of coarse-grained magnetite with an average Fe-content of 45% and 340 million tons of oxide ore with an average Fe-content of 59%.

References 

Iron mines in Senegal